Cockrell is a surname. Notable people with the surname include:

Alan Cockrell, American major league baseball player
Alvin C. Cockrell, American serviceman in World War II; Navy Cross winner
Amanda Cockrell, Hollins University professor
Byron Lavoy Cockrell, American engineer
Bud Cockrell, American musician and band member
Chris Cockrell, bass player with Kyuss
Francis Cockrell, U.S. senator from Missouri and Confederate general
Gene Cockrell (born 1934), American football player
Jeremiah V. Cockrell, U.S. congressman from Texas and Confederate officer
Kenneth Cockrell, American astronaut
Lila Cockrell, former mayor of San Antonio, Texas
Nathan Elams Cockrell, fraternity founder
Phil Cockrell, Negro league baseball player
Thad Cockrell, American musician
Simon Cockrell (1745-1835) was an American Baptist minister and politician from Virginia.

See also
Cockrell, Missouri, an unincorporated community
Cockrell Hill, Texas, a city in Texas
USS Alvin C. Cockrell (DE-366), American naval vessel
Cockrell School of Engineering, college of The University of Texas at Austin